Atterby is a hamlet within the civil parish of Bishop Norton, in the West Lindsey district of Lincolnshire, England. Between 1866 and 1936 Atterby was a civil parish.

Atterby is now little more than a cluster of buildings at a crossroads; in the 19th century it was larger with 134 inhabitants, a butcher, shop and a carrier.

By the early 20th century the Everett family had established a bus service, initially with a horse drawn omnibus and later as pioneers in the use of motorised buses. One of their early vehicles was the "Silver Queen". Everett's buses operated in the local area for many years until quite recently. In 2006 JD Everett is still in the village but as a haulage company.

Grade II listed Atterby Mill lies towards the A15 along a private road. It was powered by water from Atterby Beck (which separates the hamlet from Bishop Norton) supplemented by a steam engine. It produced animal feed ground from grain. It was built on the site of a medieval mill.  Nearby was the site of an old post windmill, long abandoned.

References

External links
Lincolnshire Archives

External links

Villages in Lincolnshire
West Lindsey District